Prince Edward County Board of Education (PECBE) was a school district in Ontario, Canada, serving Prince Edward County. Its headquarters were in Bloomfield.

The school district, as of 1997, operated eight elementary schools and one secondary school, with over 3,600 students and 275 teaching and support employees. The district served ten municipalities, including the townships of Ameliasburgh, Athol, Hallowell, Hillier, Ontario, North Marysburgh, Sophiasburg, and South Marysburgh, the villages of Bloomfield and Wellington, and Picton town.

Its territory is now served by the Hastings & Prince Edward District School Board.

Schools

Secondary schools:
 Prince Edward Collegiate Institute
Elementary schools:
 Athol-South Marysburgh School
 Kente Public School
 Massassaga-Rednersville Public School
 North Marysburgh Centennial Central School
 Pinecrest Memorial Elementary School
 Queen Elizabeth School
 Sophiasburgh Central School
 C.M.L. Snider Elementary School

References

External links

 Prince Edward County Board of Education (Archive)

Former school districts in Ontario